was a Nippon Professional Baseball second baseman and manager.

1918 births
1997 deaths
Baseball people from Osaka Prefecture
Japanese baseball players
Hanshin Tigers players
Shochiku Robins players
Mainichi Orions players
Managers of baseball teams in Japan
Chiba Lotte Marines managers
People from Yao, Osaka